CPMP may refer to:

 Committee for Proprietary Medicinal Products
 Certified Project Management Professional
 Core-Plus Mathematics Project
 Cyclic pyranopterin monophosphate or fosdenopterin
 Commissioning Process Management Professional (ASHRAE)